"The Hung Out to Dry"  is a single by Fu Manchu. It was released in 2006 on Liquor and Poker Music/Century Media Records. It contains a CD with four songs and a 7" with two songs. Both are in one special package called "The Deuce". It looks basically like a double-LP but is single-sized.

The artwork was by John McGill who later designed We Must Obey.

Track listing 
CD:
 "Hung Out to Dry" - 3:25
 "Between the Lines" - 1:32
 "Never Again" - 3:00
 "D.O.A." - 3:50 (Van Halen cover)

Vinyl:
 "Hung Out to Dry" - 3:25
 "Between the Lines" - 1:32

The first two songs were later released on the album We Must Obey.

"Never again" was later on the European version of that album as well.

"D.O.A." is a Van Halen cover.

A music video was made for the song "Hung Out to Dry" and released in 2007.

References

Fu Manchu (band) songs
2006 singles
2006 songs
Century Media Records singles